Sorrows Away is an album by English folk group The Unthanks. It was released on 14 October 2022 and received four-star reviews in The Observer and The Scotsman and a five-star review in the Financial Times.

Track listing

Charts

References

2022 albums
Albums produced by Adrian McNally
The Unthanks albums